CCGS CG 119 is a patrol vessel of the Canadian Coast Guard. The ship is a converted self-righting lifeboat similar to the Waveney-class lifeboat.

External links
Coast Guard Vessels Built or Acquired Since WWII

CG 119
1972 ships
Ships built in Quebec

Ships of the Canadian Coast Guard